Antonio Divino Moura is the first vice-president of the World Meteorological Organization and director of the Meteorological Institute of Brazil (INMET). He was founding director general of the International Research Institute for Climate and Society at Columbia University (1996-2002) and professor of meteorology at the Brazilian Space Research Institute and the University of São Paulo.
He won the Carl-Gustaf Rossby Award from the Massachusetts Institute of Technology for his PhD.

In 2018 the World Meteorological Organization named Antonio Divino Moura as the winner of its top scientific prize for outstanding work in meteorology and climatology and scientific research.

References 

Living people
World Meteorological Organization people
Year of birth missing (living people)
Columbia University faculty
Academic staff of the University of São Paulo
Massachusetts Institute of Technology alumni
Brazilian officials of the United Nations
Brazilian meteorologists